Yellow Moon in the thirteenth studio album by American country music artist Don Williams. It was released on March 25, 1983 via MCA Records. The includes the singles "Love Is on a Roll", "Nobody but You" and "Stay Young".

Track listing

Chart performance

References

1983 albums
Don Williams albums
Albums produced by Garth Fundis
MCA Records albums